The Tyumen constituency (No.185) is a Russian legislative constituency in Tyumen Oblast. The constituency covers parts of Tyumen as well as northern Tyumen Oblast. Until 2007 the constituency was more compact, covering the entirety of Tyumen and small portion of western Tyumen Oblast, however, in 2016 the constituency was pushed to the north, grabbing sparsely populated areas of former Ishim constituency; half of Tyumen was placed into new Zavodoukovsk constituency.

Members elected

Election results

1993

|-
! colspan=2 style="background-color:#E9E9E9;text-align:left;vertical-align:top;" |Candidate
! style="background-color:#E9E9E9;text-align:left;vertical-align:top;" |Party
! style="background-color:#E9E9E9;text-align:right;" |Votes
! style="background-color:#E9E9E9;text-align:right;" |%
|-
|style="background-color:"|
|align=left|Aleksandr Trushnikov
|align=left|Independent
|
|25.54%
|-
|style="background-color:"|
|align=left|Nikolay Pavlov
|align=left|Independent
| -
|20.30%
|-
| colspan="5" style="background-color:#E9E9E9;"|
|- style="font-weight:bold"
| colspan="3" style="text-align:left;" | Total
| 
| 100%
|-
| colspan="5" style="background-color:#E9E9E9;"|
|- style="font-weight:bold"
| colspan="4" |Source:
|
|}

1995

|-
! colspan=2 style="background-color:#E9E9E9;text-align:left;vertical-align:top;" |Candidate
! style="background-color:#E9E9E9;text-align:left;vertical-align:top;" |Party
! style="background-color:#E9E9E9;text-align:right;" |Votes
! style="background-color:#E9E9E9;text-align:right;" |%
|-
|style="background-color:"|
|align=left|Gennady Raikov
|align=left|Independent
|
|20.56%
|-
|style="background-color:"|
|align=left|Aleksandr Trushnikov (incumbent)
|align=left|Independent
|
|12.07%
|-
|style="background-color:"|
|align=left|Boris Grigoryev
|align=left|Independent
|
|10.34%
|-
|style="background-color:"|
|align=left|Vladimir Chertishchev
|align=left|Communist Party
|
|9.97%
|-
|style="background-color:"|
|align=left|Gennady Chebotaryov
|align=left|Our Home – Russia
|
|9.41%
|-
|style="background-color:#2C299A"|
|align=left|Aleksandr Repetov
|align=left|Congress of Russian Communities
|
|7.07%
|-
|style="background-color:#D50000"|
|align=left|Vladimir Matayev
|align=left|Communists and Working Russia - for the Soviet Union
|
|5.67%
|-
|style="background-color:"|
|align=left|Rimma Shilkova
|align=left|Independent
|
|4.69%
|-
|style="background-color:"|
|align=left|Valentin Timofeyev
|align=left|Liberal Democratic Party
|
|3.81%
|-
|style="background-color:"|
|align=left|Pavel Plavnik
|align=left|Independent
|
|2.31%
|-
|style="background-color:"|
|align=left|Oleg Andreyev
|align=left|Independent
|
|1.90%
|-
|style="background-color:"|
|align=left|Leonid Ksendzov
|align=left|Independent
|
|1.09%
|-
|style="background-color:#000000"|
|colspan=2 |against all
|
|8.62%
|-
| colspan="5" style="background-color:#E9E9E9;"|
|- style="font-weight:bold"
| colspan="3" style="text-align:left;" | Total
| 
| 100%
|-
| colspan="5" style="background-color:#E9E9E9;"|
|- style="font-weight:bold"
| colspan="4" |Source:
|
|}

1999

|-
! colspan=2 style="background-color:#E9E9E9;text-align:left;vertical-align:top;" |Candidate
! style="background-color:#E9E9E9;text-align:left;vertical-align:top;" |Party
! style="background-color:#E9E9E9;text-align:right;" |Votes
! style="background-color:#E9E9E9;text-align:right;" |%
|-
|style="background-color:"|
|align=left|Gennady Raikov (incumbent)
|align=left|Independent
|
|44.80%
|-
|style="background:#1042A5"| 
|align=left|Vadim Bondar
|align=left|Union of Right Forces
|
|12.02%
|-
|style="background-color:"|
|align=left|Svetlana Yaroslavova
|align=left|Independent
|
|9.66%
|-
|style="background-color:"|
|align=left|Yerzhan Makash
|align=left|Independent
|
|8.49%
|-
|style="background-color:"|
|align=left|Viktor Filatov
|align=left|Yabloko
|
|7.90%
|-
|style="background-color:#000000"|
|colspan=2 |against all
|
|13.40%
|-
| colspan="5" style="background-color:#E9E9E9;"|
|- style="font-weight:bold"
| colspan="3" style="text-align:left;" | Total
| 
| 100%
|-
| colspan="5" style="background-color:#E9E9E9;"|
|- style="font-weight:bold"
| colspan="4" |Source:
|
|}

2003

|-
! colspan=2 style="background-color:#E9E9E9;text-align:left;vertical-align:top;" |Candidate
! style="background-color:#E9E9E9;text-align:left;vertical-align:top;" |Party
! style="background-color:#E9E9E9;text-align:right;" |Votes
! style="background-color:#E9E9E9;text-align:right;" |%
|-
|style="background-color:#FFD700"|
|align=left|Gennady Raikov (incumbent)
|align=left|People's Party
|
|47.64%
|-
|style="background-color:#00A1FF"|
|align=left|Valery Bagin
|align=left|Party of Russia's Rebirth-Russian Party of Life
|
|9.75%
|-
|style="background-color:"|
|align=left|Lyudmila Shuyupova
|align=left|Independent
|
|8.87%
|-
|style="background-color:"|
|align=left|Yakov Kosenkov
|align=left|Agrarian Party
|
|4.23%
|-
|style="background-color:#164C8C"|
|align=left|Aleksandr Trushnikov
|align=left|United Russian Party Rus'
|
|2.98%
|-
|style="background-color:"|
|align=left|Vladimir Tretyakov
|align=left|Independent
|
|1.48%
|-
|style="background-color:#7C73CC"|
|align=left|Vyacheslav Lukichev
|align=left|Great Russia – Eurasian Union
|
|1.13%
|-
|style="background-color:"|
|align=left|Pavel Korostil
|align=left|Independent
|
|0.83%
|-
|style="background-color:#000000"|
|colspan=2 |against all
|
|20.89%
|-
| colspan="5" style="background-color:#E9E9E9;"|
|- style="font-weight:bold"
| colspan="3" style="text-align:left;" | Total
| 
| 100%
|-
| colspan="5" style="background-color:#E9E9E9;"|
|- style="font-weight:bold"
| colspan="4" |Source:
|
|}

2016

|-
! colspan=2 style="background-color:#E9E9E9;text-align:left;vertical-align:top;" |Candidate
! style="background-color:#E9E9E9;text-align:left;vertical-align:top;" |Party
! style="background-color:#E9E9E9;text-align:right;" |Votes
! style="background-color:#E9E9E9;text-align:right;" |%
|-
|style="background-color: " |
|align=left|Ernest Valeev
|align=left|United Russia
|
|56.80%
|-
|style="background-color:"|
|align=left|Sergey Morev
|align=left|A Just Russia
|
|9.05%
|-
|style="background-color:"|
|align=left|Gleb Trubin
|align=left|Liberal Democratic Party
|
|8.73%
|-
|style="background-color:"|
|align=left|Pavel Dorokhin
|align=left|Communist Party
|
|8.40%
|-
|style="background:"| 
|align=left|Yevgenia Safiyeva
|align=left|Communists of Russia
|
|2.93%
|-
|style="background:"| 
|align=left|Marat Bikmulin
|align=left|Party of Growth
|
|2.19%
|-
|style="background-color:"|
|align=left|Aleksandr Novoselov
|align=left|Rodina
|
|2.18%
|-
|style="background:"| 
|align=left|Anzhela Semyonova
|align=left|Yabloko
|
|1.89%
|-
|style="background-color:"|
|align=left|Valery Shchukin
|align=left|The Greens
|
|1.75%
|-
|style="background:"| 
|align=left|Aleksandr Nevzorov
|align=left|Patriots of Russia
|
|1.67%
|-
|style="background:#00A650"| 
|align=left|Nikolay Komoltsev
|align=left|Civilian Power
|
|1.60%
|-
|style="background:"| 
|align=left|Aleksandr Chekmaryov
|align=left|People's Freedom Party
|
|1.32%
|-
| colspan="5" style="background-color:#E9E9E9;"|
|- style="font-weight:bold"
| colspan="3" style="text-align:left;" | Total
| 
| 100%
|-
| colspan="5" style="background-color:#E9E9E9;"|
|- style="font-weight:bold"
| colspan="4" |Source:
|
|}

2021

|-
! colspan=2 style="background-color:#E9E9E9;text-align:left;vertical-align:top;" |Candidate
! style="background-color:#E9E9E9;text-align:left;vertical-align:top;" |Party
! style="background-color:#E9E9E9;text-align:right;" |Votes
! style="background-color:#E9E9E9;text-align:right;" |%
|-
|style="background-color: " |
|align=left|Nikolay Brykin
|align=left|United Russia
|
|50.89%
|-
|style="background-color:"|
|align=left|Gleb Trubin
|align=left|Liberal Democratic Party
|
|11.50%
|-
|style="background-color:"|
|align=left|Zhalauddin Abdurazakov
|align=left|Communist Party
|
|10.29%
|-
|style="background-color: "|
|align=left|Sergey Solovyev
|align=left|Party of Pensioners
|
|8.53%
|-
|style="background:"| 
|align=left|Dinar Abukin
|align=left|Communists of Russia
|
|7.63%
|-
|style="background:"| 
|align=left|Svetlana Chuykova
|align=left|Party of Growth
|
|7.21%
|-
| colspan="5" style="background-color:#E9E9E9;"|
|- style="font-weight:bold"
| colspan="3" style="text-align:left;" | Total
| 
| 100%
|-
| colspan="5" style="background-color:#E9E9E9;"|
|- style="font-weight:bold"
| colspan="4" |Source:
|
|}

Notes

References

Russian legislative constituencies
Politics of Tyumen Oblast